In mathematics, the Bessel–Maitland function, or Wright generalized Bessel function, is a generalization of the Bessel function, introduced by . The word "Maitland" in the name of the function seems to be the result of confusing Edward Maitland Wright's middle and last names. It is given by

References

Special functions